St. Francis Hospital Nkokonjeru, commonly referred to as Nkokonjeru Hospital, is a  private, non-profit, community hospital in Uganda.
It is owned by the Roman Catholic Diocese of Lugazi.

Location
The hospital is located in the town of Nkokonjeru, in Buikwe District, in the Central Region of Uganda.

Overview
Nkokonjeru Hospital is a private, non-profit, community hospital, owned by the Roman Catholic Diocese of Lugazi. It is administered by the Little Sisters of St. Francis. It has a bed capacity of 60. The hospital serves a rural population of approximately 200,000, in Buikwe District, and nearby parts of Mukono District.

The hospital is a member of the Uganda Catholic Medical Bureau. It attends to an average of 13,381 outpatients annually and admits an average of 2,061 patients annually. It averages 657 maternal deliveries every year, with a caesarian rate of 23.3 percent. Its bed occupancy ratio averages 26.7 percent.

History
In 1926, Mother Kevin-Kearney started a dispensary which developed into the current hospital. In the beginning, emphasis was placed on educating the local population in maternal and child health. In 1932, a school of nursing was established. In 1959, the Little Sisters of St. Francis took over the management of the then maternity centre and dispensary. In 1981 the institution received full accreditation as a hospital.

See also
 List of hospitals in Uganda
 Roman Catholicism in Uganda

References

External links
 Official Website

Hospitals in Uganda
Buikwe District
Central Region, Uganda
Hospitals established in 1926
1926 establishments in Uganda
Catholic hospitals in Africa
 Teaching hospitals in Uganda